Velgast (Polish: Wielgoszcz) is a municipality in the Vorpommern-Rügen district, in Mecklenburg-Vorpommern, Germany. Velgast has its own railway station Velgast railway station.

References